The Sokoch is a river in the western Kamchatka Peninsula, Russia, a right tributary of the Plotnikova.

Course

It has one tributary, the Left Sokoch, which joins it  from its mouth.
The right branch of the river flows from the Bolshoi (Large) Sokoch lake, while the left branch flows from the southeastern spurs of the  Sokoch Hill.
Lake Sokoch is in what was a proglacial basin between two terminal moraines from the Last Glacial Maximum.
Analysis of pollen from the lake sediments over the last 9600 years shows alternating warmer periods of forest cover and cooler periods of shubrlands, tundra and bogs.

The village of Sokoch is the administrative center of the Nachikinskoe rural settlement.
It was formed in 1947 as a settlement under the Nachikinsky state farm on the Plotnikova River opposite the mouth of the Sokoch River, and named after the river in 1959.

Fish

The Sokoch is known for its sockeye salmon, which spawn in the upper river above the Sokoch Lake, and in the springs that the upper river and the lake, and in the Little Sokosh Lake upstream from the main lake.
Lakeshore spawning is important in the Kamchatka Peninsula, but the Bolhsaya River system has relatively few lakes. Nachikinsky Lake is important, as is the Sokoch lake area.

References

Sources

Rivers of Kamchatka Krai
Tributaries of the Bolshaya